Thieves of the Wood is a 10-episode historical drama based on the life of the 18th-century outlaw leader Jan de Lichte, a native of Aalst in what is now Belgium. It became available to English/Spanish-speaking and Spanish-speaking viewers on Netflix in January 2020. It was first made available in Belgium on the Proximus television network and is now being broadcast on the public network by the VTM channel. The original title is De Bende van Jan de Lichte (the gang of Jan de Lichte).

Based on the 1957 novel De bende van Jan de Lichte by Louis Paul Boon, the series presents Jan de Lichte as not merely a highwayman but as a champion of the oppressed lower classes, a kind of Flemish Robin Hood. From 1740 to 1748, during the War of the Austrian Succession, Jan de Lichte operated in the countryside in the vicinity of Aalst.

The series was adapted for television by Christophe Dirickx and Benjamin Sprengers and is directed by Robin Pront and Maarten Moerkerke.
Filming took place in the fall of 2016 and the winter and spring of 2017. There was a lot of filming in the Kluisbos forest in Kluisbergen but also a few days in March 2017 at the market in Veurne and in Wulveringem at Beauvoorde Castle. There was also filming on Hasselbroekstraat and Kasteelstraat in Gingelom, in Bokrijk park, at Gravensteen castle, and in the Sahara nature preserve in Lommel.

Cast 
Jan de Lichte, Matteo Simoni
Tincke, Stef Aerts
Héloise, Charlotte Timmers
De Schoen, Anemone Valcke
Meyvis, Rik Willems 
Magician Vagenende, Iwein Segers
Bailiff Baru, Tom Van Dyck
Nicolaï Van Gelderhode, Rik Verheye
Judoca, Ruth Beeckmans
Goorissen, Mathijs Scheepers
Urkens, Michael Vergauwen
Anne-Marie, Anne-Laure Vandeputte
Marieke, Sofie De Brée
De Schele, Jeroen Perceval
Magda de Wispelaeren, Inge Paulussen
Sproetje, Manou Kersting
Minna, Greet Verstraete 
Michel Embo, Peter De Graef
De Spanjol, Tibo Vandenborre
Notary Woeste, Ludo Hoogmartens
Poelier, Tom Vermeir
Le Houcke, Arnaud Lorent

References

Flemish television shows
Television series about bandits
2010s Belgian television series debuts
Belgian drama television shows
2010s Belgian television series